Luigi Bertelli (19 March 1858 - 27 November 1920), best known as Vamba, was an Italian author, illustrator and journalist.

Born in Florence, having completed his studies Bertelli became a railway employer, working first in Rimini and later in Foggia. He later started collaborating with the Roman newspaper Capitan Fracassa and in 1884 he was officially employed as a  journalist and caricaturist. He soon adopted the pseudonym "Vamba", named after the clown of Walter Scott's Ivanhoe. After collaborating with several newspapers, in 1890 he founded and directed L'O di Giotto, a newspaper close to the radical political positions of Felice Cavallotti, and in 1901 he co-founded  the regional newspaper Il Bruscolo. Best known as a children's author, in 1893 Vamba wrote his first pedagogical  novel, Ciondolino, and in 1906 he founded and directed until 1911 the nonconformist children magazine Il giornalino della Domenica. Here, he released in sequential installments his best known novel, Il Giornalino di Gian Burrasca, the pedagogical and humorous story of a lively 9 year old. In the summer of 1920 he fell ill, dying on 27 November 1920.

A funerary monument made by the sculptor Libero Andreotti was inaugurated in Florence on 14 January 1923.

References

Further reading 
 Lea Nissim Rossi. Vamba: Luigi Bertelli. Le Monnier, 1954.
 Armando Michieli. Vamba. La Scuola, 1965.
 Lea Nissim Rossi. Luigi Bertelli (Vamba). Mondadori Education, 1967. . 
 Anna Ascenzi, Maila Di Felice, Raffaele Tumino. Santa giovinezza!: lettere di Luigi Bertelli e dei suoi corrispondenti, 1883-1920. Alfabetica Edizioni, 2008. .
 Roberta Anau. Gian Burrasca. Ragazzi di marzapane e cervello di crema. La cucina di Vamba. Il leone verde edizioni, 2010. .

1858 births
Writers from Florence
1920 deaths
Journalists from Florence
Italian male journalists
19th-century Italian novelists
20th-century Italian novelists
Italian male novelists
Italian caricaturists
Italian children's book illustrators
Italian children's writers
19th-century Italian male writers
20th-century Italian male writers
Italian magazine founders